The 2005 FIA GT Zhuhai Supercar 500 was the ninth race for the 2005 FIA GT Championship season.  It took place on 23 October 2005 at Zhuhai.

Official results

Class winners in bold.  Cars failing to complete 70% of winner's distance marked as Not Classified (NC).

Statistics
 Pole Position – #17 Russian Age Racing – 1:30.661
 Fastest Lap – #11 Larbre Compétition – 1:31.691
 Average Speed – 157.30 km/h

External links

 Official Results 
 Race results

Z
6 Hours of Zhuhai
2005 in Chinese motorsport